Ivan Ilyich Leonidov (9 February 1902 – 6 November 1959) was a Soviet constructivist architect, urban planner, painter and teacher.

Early life
Leonidov was raised on an isolated farmstead in the province of Tver Oblast. The son of a farmer and woodsman, he went to work as a casual labourer at the docks in Petrograd. When an icon painter noticed Leonidov's drawing skills, he became his apprentice.

Career
In 1919 Leonidov attended the Svomas free art studios in Tver. From 1921 to 1927 he studied at the VKhUTEMAS in Moscow under the tutelage of Alexander Vesnin at which point his attention switched from painting to architecture.

His unexecuted diploma project in 1927 for the Lenin Institute and Library, Moscow, brought him international recognition. The scheme was prominently displayed at the Exhibition of Contemporary Architecture, Moscow, and was published in the OSA Group journal Sovremennaya arkhitektura. He then went on to teach at the VKhUTEMAS between 1928 and 1930.

From 1931 to 1933 he worked in the Giprogor and Mossovet and from 1934–41 he joined the studio of Moisei Ginzburg at the People's Commissariat for heavy industry.

Leonidov's only materialized design was the 1938 staircase in Kislovodsk.

Selected works

1926 – Design for Izvestia printworks in Moscow (VKhUTEMAS studio with Alexander Vesnin)
1927 – Thesis (diploma) Lenin Institute and Library in Moscow (unexecuted)
1928 – Competition entry for the building of the Centrosojuz in Moscow
1928 – Club of the New Social Type. Variant B
1929 – Design for the Columbus monument in Santo Domingo
1929–-1930 – Competition entry for the House of Industry in Moscow
1930 – Competition entry for the culture palace of the proletarian district in Moscow
1930 – Competition entry for the socialist city Magnitogorsk (director/conductor of a group of students of the VChUTEIN)
1934 – Competition entry for the Narkomtiazhprom building (The People's Commissariat for heavy industry in Moscow), Red Square, Moscow.
1937–-1938 – Outside staircase in the Ordzonikidze sanatorium in Kislovodsk
1937–-1941 – Pioneer palace in Kalinin (Tver)
1950s – Sketch drafts for the "sun city" and the seat of the United Nations

See also
OSA Group

References

Sources

External links

Artnet

Russian Utopia

1902 births
1959 deaths
People from Staritsky District
People from Staritsky Uyezd
Russian avant-garde
Soviet architects
Soviet painters
Constructivist architects
Modernist architects
20th-century Russian architects
20th-century Russian painters
Russian male painters
Vkhutemas alumni
Academic staff of Vkhutemas
Modernist architecture in Russia
20th-century Russian male artists